Teisendorf (Central Bavarian: Deisndorf) is a municipality  in the district of Berchtesgadener Land in Bavaria in Germany.

People 
 Tobias Regner (born 1982), singer and guitarist
Xaver Struwe (born 2004), italian rapper

References

Berchtesgadener Land